The 2012–13 season was Olympique Lyonnais's 63rd professional season since its creation in 1950. The club competed in Ligue 1, finishing third, in the Coupe de France, Coupe de la Ligue, and in the UEFA Europa League.

Squad

First-team squad
As of 26 January 2013

Out on loan

Reserve squad

Competitions

Trophée des Champions

Ligue 1

League table

Results summary

Results by round

Matches

Coupe de France

Coupe de la Ligue

UEFA Europa League

Group stage

Note 1: Ironi Kiryat Shmona played their home matches at Kiryat Eliezer Stadium, Haifa instead of their regular stadium, Municipal Stadium, Kiryat Shmona.

Knockout phase

Round of 32

References

Olympique Lyonnais seasons
Lyon
Lyon